Stéphane Allagnon (born 1967 in Paris) is a French film director and screenwriter.

He spent his youth in Normandy, ( Isigny-sur-Mer ).
He graduated in Architecture at École Nationale Supérieure d'Architecture de Paris-Belleville in 1992.

Filmography
 Ill Wind a.k.a. Before the Storm (French : Vent mauvais) -, with Jonathan Zaccaï, Bernard Le Coq et Aure Atika - 92 min - Gaumont production (2007)
 Athènes-Helsinki - 13 min (2002)

External links

1967 births
Living people
Film people from Paris
French film directors
French male screenwriters
French screenwriters
People from Isigny-sur-Mer